Dora Boothby and Winifred McNair were the defending champions, but Boothby did not participate. McNair partnered with Mabel Parton but they lost in the second round to Edith Hannam and Ethel Larcombe.

Agnes Morton and Elizabeth Ryan defeated Hannam and Larcombe in the final, 6–1, 6–3 to win the ladies' doubles tennis title at the 1914 Wimbledon Championships.

Draw

Finals

Top half

Bottom half

References

External links

Women's Doubles
Wimbledon Championship by year – Women's doubles
Wimbledon Championships - Doubles
Wimbledon Championships - Doubles